Pinnel's Case [1602] 5 Co. Rep. 117a, also known as Penny v Cole, is an important case in English contract law, on the doctrine of part performance. In it, Sir Edward Coke opined that a part payment of a debt could not extinguish the obligation to pay the whole.

Facts
Pinnel sued Cole, in an action of debt upon a bond, for the sum of £8 10s. The defendant, Cole, argued he had, at Pinnel's request, tendered £5 2s 2d before the debt was due, and the plaintiff had accepted in full satisfaction for the debt.
(KahuroSam 2021)

Judgment
The case reports the judgment as follows.

Pinnel's case was followed by Foakes v Beer [1884] and Jorden v Money [1854].

Exceptions to the rule in Pinnel's Case
The case law has evolved over the years to create a number of exceptions to the rule in Pinnel's case.

The exceptions to the rule in Pinnel's case include:

 Payment accompanied by fresh consideration;
 Prepayment of debt at the creditor's request;
 Payment of a lesser sum at another place at the creditor's request;
 A contract with creditors after insolvency of the debtor;
 The parties enter into a deed of release; and
 Promissory estoppel.

See also

English contract law
Central London Property Trust Ltd v High Trees House Ltd
D&C Builders Ltd v Rees
Williams v Roffey Bros Ltd
Re Selectmove Ltd

Notes

References

English contract case law
1602 in English law
Edward Coke cases
English consideration case law